Dizadiz (also Romanized as Dīzādīz) is a village in Sudlaneh Rural District, in the Central District of Quchan County, Razavi Khorasan Province, Iran. At the 2006 census, its population was 1,104, in 256 families.

The people in Dizadiz speak a kind of Azeri language. However, some original Kurdish people immigrated a few hundred years ago and settled in Dizadiz.

References 

Populated places in Quchan County